Erling Lindahl (Juni 23, 1903 – August 8, 1973) was a Norwegian actor and stage director.

Lindahl debuted in 1933 at the Comedy Theater in Bergen and later performed at the National Theater. He appeared in many films and performed at various theaters. Lindahl played several strong character roles. He frequently appeared on NRK's Radio Theater. From 1967 until his death in 1973, Lindahl was engaged with the National Traveling Theater.

Filmography

1955: Hjem går vi ikke
1956: Kvinnens plass as an editorial staff member
1956: Toya as a doctor
1957: På slaget åtte as Haugen, a journalist
1957: Stevnemøte med glemte år as J. L. Ruud, a gynecologist
1957: Toya og Heidi as Uncle Erling
1958: De dødes tjern as Kai Bugge, a psychologist
1958: I slik en natt as the interrogator
1958: Pastor Jarman kommer hjem
1958: Ut av mørket as the physician
1961: Den anstendige skjøgen (TV) as the senator
1961: Hans Nielsen Hauge as Hoffgaard, the bailiff in Smålenene
1961: I faresonen
1961: Sønner av Norge as the man in the newspaper editorial office
1962: Eurydike (TV)
1963: Fuglen i La Plata (TV)
1963: Kranes konditori (TV) as Buck
1964: Alle tiders kupp as Iversen the office manager 
1964: Klokker i måneskinn as the chamberlain in The Author's Tale
1964: Nydelige nelliker as the actor
1966: Broder Gabrielsen as the judge
1968: Smuglere as Toller
1970: En Hanske (TV) as Hoff

References

External links
 
 Erling Lindahl at Sceneweb
 Erling Lindahl at the Swedish Film Database
 Erling Lindahl at Filmfront

1903 births
1973 deaths
20th-century Norwegian male actors
Actors from Bergen